Hatnur dam is an earth fill dam in Jalgaon district of Maharashtra, India. The dam is named after a nearby Hatnur village, which is present by side of the dam.

Construction
This Dam was constructed by the Government of India in 1982.

Specifications

  Spillway gates -  
Hatnur dam has 41 radial-type spillways. Their size is 12 x 6.5 (m*m) and length is 604.75 meters. The type of these spillways is Ogee. These gates are mechanically controlled to control the flow of reservoir's water and for flood control, and to avoid overflow of dam and consequences of overflow of dam like damage to the structure of dam.

Purposes
Hatnur dam is one of the biggest dams of Maharashtra. It servers for agricultural irrigation, for domestic use, hydroelectric power generation (~1420MW), fishery etc.

See also
 Dams in Maharashtra
 List of reservoirs and dams in India

Dams in Jalgaon district
Dams on the Tapti River
Dams completed in 1982
1982 establishments in Maharashtra